Prem Geet 3 is a 2022 Nepali language film, also dubbed & released in Hindi over Nepal & India, directed by Chhetan Gurung and Santosh Sen under the banner of Aasusen Films Production (Nepal), Reltic Pictures (India) and Sparkling Studio (India). It is the first Indo-Nepali film; the first film to be released in both Nepali and Hindi simultaneously. It was expected to be released in 80 to 90 countries and in 500 to 1,000 cinema halls in India. Sen made his directorial debut through this film. The film was released on September 23, 2022. The majority of the filming took place in upper Manang with the remaining taking place on sets built in Kritipur. The film features Pradeep Khadka, Kristina Gurung, Shiva Shrestha, and Sunil Thapa in lead role. Gurung made her debut through this film; she was selected after outperforming the other 27,013 participants at the audition.

Earlier films in the franchise, Prem Geet and Prem Geet 2 were huge commercial success. Prem Geet 3 claims to have sold its distribution rights in India for ₹4 crore. The film was renamed Vishwajitam for Hindi version, but it was later changed back to Prem Geet 3. The film is also set to be released in China in Chinese language.

Prem Geet 3 is made on a budget of NRs. 4 crore, making it one of the most expensive Nepali film; the film was initially scheduled to release on April 10, 2020, and then rescheduled to February 25, 2021. However, both releases were postponed due to the COVID-19 pandemic's aftermath shutting many cinemas in the country.

Prem Geet 3 broke several records and grossed over रू.35 crore globally and became the all-time highest grossing Nepali film worldwide in the history of Nepali cinema surpassing recently released Kabaddi 4: The Final Match

Premise 
It is a historical action film with a plot set on a two hundred year old love story.

Cast 

 Pradeep Khadka as Prem
 Anubhav Regmi as young Prem
 Kristina Gurung as Geet
 Yogisha Khatri as young Geet
 Shiva Shrestha
 Sunil Thapa
 Santosh Sen
 Maotse Gurung
 Manish Raut
 Puskar Karki
 Prem Puri
 Yogisha Khatri
 Sambridhi Shahi Thakuri
 Krijan Gautam
 Jivan Baral
 Jiban Bhattarai
 Laxmi Bardewa
 Sujal Basnet
 Raj Thapa

Production 

 Chhetan Gurung - director, writer
 Santosh Sen - director, producer
 Mandip Gautam - writer
 Banish Shah - editor
 Bhupendra Adhikari - editor
 Kalyan Singh - music composer
 Alish Karki - music composer

Soundtrack

Nepali

Hindi

Reception 

As of September 25, 2022, Prem Geet 3 is rated 8.7/10 in IMDb, a movies review aggregator website, and 97% of Google Users who have watched the movie liked it. These statistics are subject to change in the near future. Likewise, the Times of India rated it 4.8 out of 5.

References

External links 

 Prem Geet 3 at Film Development Board

Nepalese drama films
2022 films
2020s Nepali-language films
Indian historical romance films
Indian historical drama films
Nepalese multilingual films
Indian multilingual films
Period action films
2020s historical drama films
2020s Hindi-language films
2022 multilingual films